The 1983 Pontins Brean Sands Championship was a professional invitational snooker tournament which took place in May 1983 in Burnham-on-Sea, England.

The tournament featured six professional players. Beginning with a single group stage, four players advanced to the semi-finals. The group matches and semi-finals were contested over the best of 9 frames, and the final over the best of 17 frames. Unlike other tournaments, all 9 frames in the group stage were played even when a match had already been won.

Tony Meo won the event, beating Silvino Francisco 9–7 in the final.

Group stage

  Silvino Francisco 5–4 Jimmy White 
  Tony Meo 5–4 Silvino Francisco 
  Tony Meo 6–3 Jimmy White 
  John Spencer 6–3 Cliff Wilson 
  John Virgo 7–2 Cliff Wilson 
  John Virgo 8–1 John Spencer

Knockout stage

References

Snooker competitions in England
Pontins Brean Sands
Pontins Brean Sands
Pontins Brean Sands